Tegostoma albizonalis is a moth in the family Crambidae. It was described by George Hampson in 1900. It is found in Central Asia, where it has been recorded from Armenia and Turkmenistan.

References

Odontiini
Moths described in 1900
Moths of Asia
Taxa named by George Hampson